The Key silverside (Menidia conchorum) is a species of fish in the family Atherinopsidae. It is endemic to the Florida Keys.

The Key silverside is a distinct and unique species, endemic to the Florida Keys, proven morphologically and genetically distinct from nearby related species (O'Leary et al. 2016). The species is greatly reduced in number, and the ponded salt waters in the lower Florida Keys are being rapidly lost to sea level rise. The species itself harbors a unique genetic diversity and adaptive potential. Numerous observations and recent studies agree that managing key silversides as a separate management unit is necessary. It has been recently recommended for threatened status by the Florida Fish and Wildlife Conservation Commission. The species is a U.S. National Marine Fisheries Service Species of Concern.  Species of Concern are those species about which the U.S. Government's National Oceanic and Atmospheric Administration, National Marine Fisheries Service, has some concerns regarding status and threats, but for which insufficient information is available to indicate a need to list the species under the U.S. Endangered Species Act (ESA).

Species Description
Getter (1981) surveyed the entire chain of the Florida Keys in the late 1970s and determined that the Key silverside has a restricted distribution and is only found in lagoonal and ponded waters of the Florida Keys. These ponds and lagoons are a relatively rare and novel habitat shared by a community of fishes, many found nowhere else. The Key silverside is the smallest known species of Menidia, females reach 58 mm (standard length) and males 50 mm. While the Key silverside is closely related to (paraphyletic with) the Tidewater silverside (Menidia peninsulae) it is distinctly deeper bodied and yellow in color, restricted in range and habitat. It is also less cold-tolerant in lab situations.

Conservation
Sea-level rise has flooded many of the largest salt ponds that are now lagoonal and flushed with each tide. These fragmented series of isolated ponds were the key to the survival of the species. Historically, salt ponds and lagoons have been filled for development which has reduced available habitats through the loss of a number of ponds and formerly occupied sites and ponded and lagoonal habitats.

Conservation Designations
Florida Fish and Wildlife Conservation Commission: 
Based on the finding of the Key silverside BRG and subsequent consultation with other
FWC fish experts, staff recommends that the Key silverside (Menidia conchorum) be listed as a
Threatened species because it met criteria for listing in accordance with rule 68A-27.0012,
F.A.C.

Status Reviews
Research is underway by Dr. Charles D. Getter (Getter 2009, 2010), who has studied the species since the 1970s for his doctoral dissertation (1981). Charles D. Getter. Ecology and survival of the Key silverside, Menidia conchorum, an atherinid fish endemic to the Florida Keys. Ph.D., University of Miami, Rosenstiel School of Marine and Atmospheric Sciences), now being updated with new data and readied for publication.

References

 Population genetics and geometric morphometrics of the key silverside, Menidia conchorum, a marine fish in a highly fragmented inland habitat
SJ O'Leary, CM Martinez, H Baumann, DL Abercrombie… - Bulletin of Marine Science, 2016

 Getter 1981. Ecology and survival of the Key silverside, Menidia conchorum, an atherinid fish endemic to the Florida Keys. Ph.D., University of Miami, Rosenstiel School of Marine and Atmospheric Sciences. Charles D. Getter. 1981.

 Getter 2009. Monitoring sea level rise impacts in mangroves and lagoonal ecosystems of the lower Florida Keys. The paper was given at the Florida Keys Sea level rise conference in Duck Key, Florida, 2009. https://www.researchgate.net/project/Florida-Keys-Sea-Level-Rise-Monitoring-Project

 Getter 2010. Fishes of Transitional Marine Habitats of The Lower Florida Keys: Projected Impact of Accelerated Sea Level Risehttps://www.researchgate.net/publication/312581060_Fishes_of_Transitional_MarineHabitats_of_The_Lower_Florida_Keys_Projected_Impact_of_Accelerated_Sea_Level_Rise

Menidia
Fish described in 1927
Fish of the United States
Taxonomy articles created by Polbot
Taxa named by Samuel Frederick Hildebrand
Taxa named by Isaac Ginsburg